The Hong Djien (born 12 January 1916, date of death unknown) was an Indonesian football forward who played for the Dutch East Indies in the 1938 FIFA World Cup. He also played for Tiong Hoa Soerabaja. Djien was scouted by several major clubs, including Santos, Barcelona, during the 1938 World Cup, but he chose to stay in his native Indonesia to run the local farm his family owned.

References

External links
 

1916 births
Year of death missing
Indonesian footballers
Indonesia international footballers
Indonesian people of Chinese descent
Indonesian sportspeople of Chinese descent
Association football forwards
Tiong Hoa Soerabaja players
1938 FIFA World Cup players